The 2002 Sparkassen Cup singles was the tennis singles event of the thirteenth edition of the Sparkassen Cup; a WTA Tier II tournament held in Leipzig, Germany. Kim Clijsters was the two-time defending champion but lost in the semifinal to Anastasia Myskina.

World No.1 Serena Williams beat Anastasia Myskina 6–3, 6–2 in the final. Myskina would go on to win the title the following year.

Seeds
The top four seeds received a bye to the second round.

Draw

Finals

Top half

Bottom half

External links
 2002 Sparkassen Cup draw

Singles 2002
2002 WTA Tour